Steve Tucker may refer to:

 Steve Tucker (musician), member of Morbid Angel
 Steve Tucker (rower) (born 1969), American rower